The Bibliothèque Inguimbertine is a scholarly library located in Carpentras. It was established by Joseph-Dominique d'Inguimbert, the Bishop of Carpentras from 1735 to 1754. It has been called "the oldest of our municipal libraries" by current chief librarian Jean-François Delmas. It currently contains about 220,000 books.

The library is known to bibliophiles all over France and is scheduled to move into roomier quarters in the former Hôtel-Dieu in 2013.

References

Further reading
  Chapitre I: une histoire pluriséculaire; Chapitre II: des collections protéiformes; Chapitre III: un projet pour le 3e millénaire.
 

Libraries in France
Buildings and structures in Vaucluse
Organizations based in Provence-Alpes-Côte d'Azur
Libraries established in 1735
1735 establishments in France